The 2011 Kansas City mayoral election was held February 22 and March 22, 2011 to elect the mayor of Kansas City, Missouri. It saw the election of Sly James, who unseated incumbent mayor Mark Funkhouser (who was eliminated in the primary).

Results

Primary

General election

References

2010s in Kansas City, Missouri
2011 Missouri elections
2011 United States mayoral elections
2011
Non-partisan elections